Juan Alberto Belloch (born 1950) is a Spanish judge and socialist politician, who served in different cabinet posts. He served as the mayor of Zaragoza between June 2003 and 13 June 2015.

Early life and education
Belloch was born in Mora de Rubielos, Teruel Province, in 1950. He graduated from the University of Barcelona with a law degree.

Career and activities
Belloch worked as a judge in the Basque county. He is the founder of the Judges for Democracy and was an active member of the organization until 1990. He also established the association for human rights in 1984. He served as the president of the provincial court of Vizcaya. In 1990, he was appointed a member of the general council of the judiciary.

Belloch is a member of Spain's Socialist Party. On 14 July 1993 he was appointed justice minister in a cabinet reshuffle and became part of the cabinet led by the prime minister Felipe Gonzalez. However, he was an independent member of the cabinet. He served in the post until 6 May 1996.

He was also appointed interior minister on 5 May 1994, replacing Antoni Asunción Hernández in the post, who resigned from office in late April 1994. Therefore, both justice ministry and interior ministry were headed by Belloch. His attempts to clean the ministry of interior led to the discovery of the GAL affair which triggered the trial and arrest of the former interior minister José Barrionuevo. The affair then was searched by an inquiry committee in the Spanish senate and following the inquiry it was dissolved. Belloch was in office until 6 May 1996 and was succeeded by Jaime Mayor Oreja in the post. He became a member of the Spanish parliament in 1996, representing Zaragoza province. and served there until 2000. Next he became a senator for Zaragoza and held the post from 2000 to 2004.

After leaving office, he became a Zaragoza councilman. He ran for the mayor of Zaragoza and was elected to the post in June 2003. He was reelected for office in 2007 and in 2011. In 2008, he was appointed the chairman of the association of cities and regions hosting an international exposition (AVE). He attempted to make Zaragoza the European Capital of Culture for 2016. His other significant activity as mayor was to make the city the host of the Winter Olympics in 2022. In the municipal elections in May 2015 he lost and Pedro Santisteve was elected as the mayor of Zaragoza.

References

External links

20th-century Spanish judges
1950 births
Interior ministers of Spain
Justice ministers of Spain
Living people
Mayors of Zaragoza
Members of the 6th Congress of Deputies (Spain)
Members of the General Council of the Judiciary
Members of the Senate of Spain
Municipal councillors in the province of Zaragoza
People from Gúdar-Javalambre
Spanish human rights activists
Spanish Socialist Workers' Party politicians
University of Barcelona alumni